Khvajeh Do Chahi (also Romanized as Khvājeh Do Chāhī, Khājeh-Dochāhī, and Khwāja Dūchāhi; also known as Khvājeh Do Chāh, Khvājeh Dūchāhān, and Khvājej Do Jahān) is a village in Bandan Rural District, in the Central District of Nehbandan County, South Khorasan Province, Iran. At the 2006 census, its population was 845, in 160 families.

References 

Populated places in Nehbandan County